Defiance may refer to:

Film, television and theatre 
 Defiance (1952 film), a Swedish drama film directed by Gustaf Molander
 Defiance (1980 film), an American crime drama starring Jan-Michael Vincent
 Defiance (2002 film), a western starring Brandon Bollig
 Defiance (2008 film), an American World War II film starring Daniel Craig and Liev Schreiber
 Defiance (TV series), a science fiction TV series
 Defiance (play), a 2005 play by John Patrick Shanley
 HMAS Defiance, a fictional Australian warship in the TV series Patrol Boat

Games 
 Defiance (video game), a 2013 tie-in with the TV series Defiance
 Defiance (1997 video game), a first-person shooter for Windows
 Defiance, an expansion campaign for the computer game Independence War
 Legacy of Kain: Defiance, a 2003 video game

Literature 
 Defiance (book), a 1951 memoir by Savitri Devi
 Defiance (novel), a 2007 novel by Don Brown
 Defiance, a novel by Kenneth Bulmer
 Defiance: The Bielski Partisans, a book by Nechama Tec; basis for the 2008 film (see above)

Music 
 Defiance (metal band), an American thrash metal band
 Defiance (punk band), an American street punk band
 Defiance (EP), a 1994 EP by the punk band
 Defiance (Assemblage 23 album), 2002
 Defiance (Deströyer 666 album), 2009
 Defiance (Lahannya album), 2009
 Defiance, an album by Jack Starr's Burning Starr, 2009
 Defiance, an album by Pro-jekt, 2006
 Defiance, an EP by Rome, 2022
 Defiance Records, a German record label

Maritime 
 HMS Defiance, nineteen ships of the British Royal Navy
 USS Defiance, three ships of the U.S. Navy
 Defiance (steamboat), a vessel in the Puget Sound Mosquito Fleet in the early 1900s
 Defiance (yacht), a participant in the 1914 America's Cup
 SS Empire Defiance, a ship in the Empire series in the service of the British Government
 CSS Defiance, a ship in the Confederate River Defense Fleet during the American Civil War

Places in the United States 
 Defiance, Iowa
 Defiance, Kentucky
 Defiance, Missouri (St. Charles county)
 Defiance, Missouri (Worth county) a 19th-century town
 Defiance, Ohio
 Defiance College
 Defiance High School (Ohio)
 Defiance Regional Medical Center
 Defiance County, Ohio
 Defiance Township, Defiance County, Ohio
 Defiance, Pennsylvania
 Mount Defiance (New York), a hill in New York

Other uses 
 Defiance Campaign, a 1951 anti-apartheid initiative by the African National Congress
 Defiance railway station, or Defiance Platform, a disused station on the Plymouth to Penzance Line in the UK
 Defiance Technologies, part of the Hinduja Group, a provider of IT, ERP and engineering services
 Camp Defiance, a Union camp in Kansas during the American Civil War
 Defiance Cycle Company, a cycle manufacturer formed in Wales in 1880
 Defiance Wrestling Federation, a defunct pro wrestling promotion from 2009 to 2010
 DEFIANCE Wrestling, a similarly named and currently active pro wrestling promotion

See also
 Fort Defiance (disambiguation)
 Point Defiance (disambiguation)
 Defiant (disambiguation)
 Defy (disambiguation)